The Hands of Orlac may refer to:

 Les Mains d'Orlac, a novel by Maurice Renard

and several adaptations of that novel:

 The Hands of Orlac (1924 film), an Austrian film
 The Hands of Orlac (1935 film), an American film known as Mad Love
 The Hands of Orlac (1960 film), a French-British film